Jonathan Parpeix (born 4 March 1990) is a French professional footballer who currently plays as a defender for EUGA Ardziv.

Career
He made his debut as a professional player in Ligue 2 for Nîmes Olympique on 10 September 2010, coming on as a substitute for Olivier Davidas in the 2–0 win over Angers.

In 2017, Jonathan played a promising season with the FC Miami City and was named All-league player in the Southern conference where he finished the 2017 regular season with eight assists – second-most across the PDL.

References

External links
Jonathan Parpeix career statistics at foot-national.com

1990 births
Living people
Footballers from Nîmes
French footballers
Association football midfielders
Nîmes Olympique players
Apollon Smyrnis F.C. players
FC Martigues players
FC Miami City players
Marignane Gignac Côte Bleue FC players
Ligue 2 players
Championnat National players
Championnat National 2 players
Championnat National 3 players